Sinnathamby Nagarajah (28 February 1931 – 8 May 2008) was a Sri Lankan Tamil lawyer and Mayor of Jaffna.

Early life and family
Nagarajah was born on 28 February 1931. He was educated at Jaffna Hindu College. After school he went to the Madras Christian College from where he obtained a bachelor's degree and master's degree in English Literature.

Career
After returning to Ceylon Nagarajah worked as an attorney-at-law in the north and east of the country.

Nagarajah was elected to Jaffna Municipal Council, serving as the city's mayor in 1966. He became vice-chairman of the newly created Jaffna District Development Council in 1981 but resigned in 1982.

After the Indian Peace Keeping Force occupied Jaffna in 1989 Nagarajah moved to the Vanni with the rebel Liberation Tigers of Tamil Eelam (LTTE). He taught at the LTTE's Tamil Eelam Judiciary Department.

Later life
Nagarajah moved to New Jersey, USA in the 1990s and was active in the diaspora community. He died on 8 May 2008 in New Jersey.

References

1931 births
2008 deaths
Alumni of Jaffna Hindu College
American people of Sri Lankan Tamil descent
Madras Christian College alumni
Mayors of Jaffna
Sri Lankan Tamil lawyers
Sri Lankan Tamil politicians